Paula Umaña (born 10 September 1974) is a Costa Rican former professional tennis player.

Paula is a Catholic Speaker and Author of “40 Gifts of Hope” (40 Regalos de Esperanza).

Between 1992 and 2000, Umaña represented the Costa Rica Fed Cup team in a total of 33 ties, winning nine singles and ten doubles rubbers for her country.

Umaña, who now lives in the US state of Georgia, is a younger sister of CNN en Español anchor Glenda Umaña.

ITF finals

Doubles: 4 (0–4)

References

External links
 
 
 

1974 births
Living people
Costa Rican emigrants to the United States
Costa Rican female tennis players